Kittu, a 2006 traditionally animated Indian feature film
 Kittu (crater), crater on Ganymede
 Kittu (Tamil militant) (1960–1993), nom de guerre of Sri Lankan Tamil rebel Sathasivam Krishnakumar
 Maaveeran Kittu, 2016 Indian drama film
 Kittu or Kittum, a Mesopotamian goddess